The 1940 United States Senate election in Nebraska took place on November 5, 1940. Hugh A. Butler was elected for the first time, defeating Governor Robert Leroy Cochran. Edward R. Burke, the incumbent Senator, was defeated by Cochran in the primary. Butler performed on par with Wendell Willkie, who won the state with 57.2% in the presidential election.

Democratic primary

Candidates
Edward R. Burke, the incumbent Senator
Robert Leroy Cochran, Governor of Nebraska

Results

Republican primary

Candidates
Hugh A. Butler, Republican National committeeman for Nebraska
Albert W. Jefferis, former Representative for Nebraska's 2nd district
Adam McMullen, former Governor of Nebraska
Arthur J. Weaver, former Governor of Nebraska

Results

Results

References 

1940
Nebraska
United States Senate